Thai tailor scam, also known as the Bangkok tailor scam is one of the most common confidence tricks performed in tourist hotspots in Thailand, such as Pattaya, Bangkok, Phuket, and beach towns like Khao Lak.  

The scam usually involves a friendly person approaching their chosen victim, offering quality tailor-made clothes at prices cheaper than in department stores. The seller will claim to have an international export company that just opened. After paying up front, the buyer will receive a low-quality, ill-fitting garment made of polyester rather than the promised cashmere or other high quality cloth. Scammers may not be Thai. In one case, a Singaporean worked with Thais to trick Singaporean tourists.

See also 
 Gem scam
 Thai zig zag scam
 Crime in Thailand

References

External links
travelscams.org - 45 Tourist targeted acams in Thailand

Confidence tricks
Thai clothing
Fraud in Thailand
Organised crime in Thailand